Chmiel is a Polish surname and toponym, meaning hops. It may refer to:

People with the surname
 Beata Chmiel, Polish activist
 Damian Chmiel (born 1987), Polish footballer
David Chmiel. (born 1969), 10X Pennsylvania super lawyer award winner
 Juraj Chmiel (born 1960), Czech-Slovak politician
 Karol Chmiel (1911–1951), Polish resistance fighter

Places
 Chmiel, Bieszczady County, a village in Bieszczady County
 Chmiel Drugi, a village in Lublin County
 Chmiel Pierwszy, a village in Lublin County
 Chmiel-Kolonia, a village in Lublin County

See also
 

Polish-language surnames